Abu Taher (1938–1976) was a Bangladeshi military officer and political activist.

Abu Taher may also refer to:

 Shams al-Dawla (died 1021), title of Abu Taher, former ruler of Hamadan, Iran
 Abu Taher (banker) (c.1932–2004), Bangladeshi banker and politician
 Abu Taher (artist) (1936–2020), Bangladeshi painter and Ekushey Padak winner
 Abu Taher (rear admiral), former chief of staff of Bangladesh Navy
 Abu Taher (1954-1999) was a Bangladeshi music director 
 Abu Taher Mondal (born 1967), Bengali politician of Meghalaya